Kolajan-e Sadat (also Romanized as Kolājān-e Sādāt) is a village in Roshanabad Rural District, in the Central District of Gorgan County, Golestan Province, Iran. At the 2006 census, its population was 243, in 58 families.

References 

Populated places in Gorgan County